The Greenwich Time Signal (GTS), popularly known as the pips, is a series of six short tones (or "pips") broadcast at one-second intervals by many BBC Radio stations. The pips were introduced in 1924 and have been generated by the BBC since 1990 to mark the precise start of each hour. Their utility in calibration is diminishing as digital broadcasting entails time lags.

Structure

There are six pips (short beeps) in total, which occur on each of the 5 seconds leading up to the hour and on the hour itself. Each pip is a 1 kHz tone (about a fifth of a semitone above musical B5) the first five of which last a tenth of a second each, while the final pip lasts half a second. The actual moment when the hour changes – the "on-time marker" – is at the very beginning of the last pip.

When a leap second occurs (exactly one second before midnight UTC), it is indicated by a seventh pip. In this case the first pip occurs at 23:59:55 (as usual) and there is a sixth short pip at 23:59:60 (the leap second) followed by the long pip at 00:00:00.  The possibility of an extra pip for the leap second thus justifies the final pip being longer than the others, so that it is always clear which pip is on the hour.  Before leap seconds were conceived, the final pip was the same length as the others.  Although "negative" leap seconds can also be used to make the year shorter, this has never happened in practice.

Although normally broadcast only on the hour by BBC domestic radio, BBC World Service uses the signal at other times as well. The signal is generated at each quarter-hour and has on occasion been broadcast in error.

Until 1972, the pips were of equal length and confusion arose as to which was the final pip, hence the last pip is now of extended length.

Usage
The pips are available to BBC radio stations every fifteen minutes, but, except in rare cases, they are only broadcast on the hour, usually before news bulletins or news programmes. Normally, BBC Radio 4 broadcast the pips every hour except at 18:00 and 00:00, and at 22:00 on Sundays (at the start of the Westminster Hour) when they are replaced by the striking of Big Ben at the Palace of Westminster. No time signal is broadcast at 10:00 on Sundays, before the omnibus edition of The Archers. On BBC Radio 2, the pips are used at 07:00, 08:00 and 17:00 on weekdays, at 07:00 and 08:00 on Saturdays and at 08:00 and 09:00 on Sundays.

The pips were used on BBC Radio 1 during The Chris Moyles Show at 06:30 just after the news, 09:00 as part of the "Tedious Link" feature, 10:00 (at the end of the show) and often before Newsbeat. As most stations only air the pips on the hour, The Chris Moyles Show was the only show where the pips were broadcast on the half-hour. Chris Moyles continues to use the pips at the beginning of his show on Radio X. The pips were previously used at 19:00 on Saturday evenings at the start of Radio 1's 12-hour simulcast with digital station BBC Radio 1Xtra. On 19 September 2022 on Radio 4, a 10 minute long pip was used at 10:50 before The Queen's 
State funeral began at 11:00 BST. The pips were also used on Radio 6 Music for a rare occurrence. It took place between 2009 and 2011 on weekdays and the pips were played at 10:00 (end of the breakfast show) and at 19:00 (end of the drive show). On Remembrance Day and Remembrance Sunday, Radio 4 uses the pips at 10:59:55 to mark the start of the two minutes silence and again at 11:01:55 to mark the end. From 2000 to 2008 BBC Radio 5 live used the pips weekdays at 06:00

BBC Radio 3 and BBC Radio 5 Live do not currently broadcast the pips.

The BBC World Service broadcasts the pips every hour.

Pips were also heard on many BBC Local Radio stations until the introduction of a new presentation package in 2020. A rare quarter-hour Greenwich Time Signal was heard at 05:15 weekdays on Wally Webb's programme on local radio in the east of England until it ended in March 2020, as part of his "synchronised cup of tea" feature.

In 1999, pip-like sounds were incorporated into the themes written by composer David Lowe to introduce BBC Television News programmes. They are still used today on BBC One, BBC Two, BBC World News and BBC News.

The BBC does not allow the pips to be broadcast except as a time signal. Radio plays and comedies which have fictional news programmes use various methods to avoid playing the full six pips, ranging from simply fading in the pips to a version played on On the Hour in which the sound was made into a small tune between the pips. The News Quiz also featured a special Christmas pantomime edition where the pips went "missing", and the problem was avoided there by only playing individual pips. The 2012 project Radio Reunited used the pips to commemorate 90 years of BBC Radio.

Accuracy
The pips for national radio stations and some local radio stations are timed relative to UTC, from an atomic clock in the basement of Broadcasting House synchronised with the National Physical Laboratory's Time from NPL and GPS. On other stations, the pips are generated locally from a GPS-synchronised clock.

The BBC compensates for the time delay in both broadcasting and receiving equipment, as well as the time for the actual transmission.

As a pre-IRIG and pre-NTP time transfer and transmission system, the pips have been a great technological success. In modern times, however, time can be transferred to systems with CPUs and operating systems by using BCD or some Unix Time variant.

Newer digital broadcasting methods have introduced even greater problems for the accuracy of use of the pips. On digital platforms such as DVB, DAB, satellite and the Internet, the pips—although generated accurately—are not heard by the listener exactly on the hour. The encoding and decoding of the digital signal causes a delay, of usually between 2 and 8 seconds. In the case of satellite broadcasting, the travel time of the signal to and from the satellite adds about another 0.25 seconds.

History

The pips have been broadcast daily since 5 February 1924,
and were the idea of the Astronomer Royal, Sir Frank Watson Dyson, and the head of the BBC, John Reith. The pips were originally controlled by two mechanical clocks located in the Royal Greenwich Observatory that had electrical contacts attached to their pendula. Two clocks were used in case of a breakdown of one. These sent a signal each second to the BBC, which converted them to the audible oscillatory tone broadcast.

The Royal Greenwich Observatory moved to Herstmonceux Castle in 1957 and the GTS equipment followed a few years later in the form of an electronic clock. Reliability was improved by renting two lines for the service between Herstmonceux and the BBC, with a changeover between the two at Broadcasting House if the main line became disconnected.

The tone sent on the lines was inverted: the signal sent to the BBC was a steady 1 kHz tone when no pip was required, and no tone when a pip should be sounded. This let faults on the line be detected immediately by automated monitoring for loss of audio.

The Greenwich Time Signal was the first sound heard in the handover to the London 2012 Olympics during the Beijing 2008 Olympics closing ceremony.

The pips were also broadcast by the BBC Television Service, but this practice was discontinued by the 1960s.

To celebrate the 90th birthday of the pips on 5 February 2014, the Today programme broadcast a sequence that included a re-working of the Happy Birthday melody using the GTS as its base sound.

Crashing the pips
The BBC discourages any other sound being broadcast at the same time as the pips; doing so is commonly known as "crashing the pips". This was most often referred to on Terry Wogan's Radio 2 Breakfast show, although usually only in jest since the actual event happened rarely. Different BBC Radio stations approach this issue differently. Radio 1 and Radio 2 generally take a relaxed approach with the pips, usually playing them over the closing seconds of a song or a jingle "bed" (background music from a jingle), followed by their respective news jingles. Many BBC local radio stations also played the pips over the station's jingle before the 2020 rebrand. BBC Radio 4 is stricter, as it is an almost entirely speech-based network.

As a contribution to Comic Relief's 2005 Red Nose Day, the BBC developed a "pips" ring-tone which could be downloaded.

Bill Bailey's BBC Rave includes the BBC News theme, which incorporates a variant of the pips (though not actually broadcast exactly on the hour). The footage can be seen on his DVD Part Troll.

In the late 1980s Radio 1 featured the pips played over a station jingle during Jakki Brambles' early show and Simon Mayo's breakfast show. This was not strictly "crashing the pips" as they were not intended to be used as an accurate time signal.

Technical problems
At 8 am on 17 September 2008, to the surprise of John Humphrys, the day's main presenter on the Today programme, and Johnnie Walker, who was standing in for Terry Wogan on Radio 2, the pips went "adrift" by six seconds, and broadcast seven pips rather than six. This was traced to a problem with the pip generator, which was rectified by switching it off and on again. Part of Humphrys' surprise was probably because of his deliberate avoidance of crashing the pips with the help of an accurate clock in the studio.

A sudden total failure in the generation of the audio pulses that constitute the pips was experienced on 31 May 2011 and silence was unexpectedly broadcast in place of the 17:00 signal. The problem was traced to the power supply of the equipment which converts the signal from the atomic clocks into an audible signal. Whilst repairs were underway the BBC elected to broadcast a "dignified silence" in place of the pips at 19:00. By 19:45 the same day the power supply was repaired and the 20:00 pips were broadcast as normal.

Similar time signals elsewhere

Many radio broadcasters around the world use the Greenwich Time Signal, or a variant thereof, as a means to mark the start of the hour. The pips are used in both domestic and international commercial and public broadcasting. Many radio stations use six tones similar to those used by the BBC World Service; some shorten it to five, four, or three tones. On some broadcasters the final pip is of a different pitch.

 Argentina – all news/talk stations (Radio Nacional, Radio Mitre, Radio Continental, Radio 10, Cadena 3, etc.) air the six pips similar to the BBC every hour, and 3 pips for every half-hour similar to Catalonia. Also some online radios like Comucosas Radio, plays the pips. 
 Australia – pips are used on ABC Radio National and ABC Local Radio at the top of every hour, as well as on Fairfax Media talkback stations- 2UE, 3AW, 4BC and 6PR. In Australia, the news pips are closer to 735 Hz and each of the six pips lasts for half a second. After each pip, there is half a second of silence.
 Brazil - Some news stations, such as the national station Radio Bandeirantes, and the regional stations Radio Guaíba and Radio Gaúcha broadcasts a similar time signal every 15 minutes. In Radio Bandeirantes, there is 5-pips signal (called as "fifth signal"), broadcast every 15 minutes. In Radio Gaúcha, a 4-pips signal with 3 tones in 920 Hz and the last in 1360 Hz is broadcast every 15 minutes. The musical radio network Atlântida FM, which broadcasts to the states of Rio Grande do Sul and Santa Catarina transmits an audible signal every 15 minutes, composed by the first four notes of the song "Here Comes the Sun".
 Bulgaria - on all BNR radio stations, the pips are broadcast on the hour. 5 short pips and a long pip is broadcast between :55 and :00. The time signal broadcast at 15:00 EET is from Bulgarian Institute of Metrology.
 Canada – the National Research Council Time Signal is broadcast daily on Ici Radio-Canada Première at 12:00 EST/EDT and on CBC Radio One at 13:00 EST/EDT. It is Canada's longest running radio feature and has been broadcast every day since 5 November 1939.
 China – China National Radio and all local radio stations use a similar 6-pip time signal on the hour. 5 short lower-pitched (0.25 s, 800 Hz) pips are played to count down the final 5 seconds of the old hour, and a longer, higher-pitched (0.5 s, 1600 Hz) pip is played to mark the beginning of the new hour.
 Czech Republic - The pips are broadcast on Czech Public Radio Český Rozhlas on ČRo Radiožurnál, ČRo Dvojka, ČRo Plus and on the Regional Stations (3 little pips and 1 long pipe). The pips are not played at special programs and Transmission.
 Egypt - Nile FM broadcasts pips similar to the BBC at 16:00hrs daily at the start of the Drive Show. 
 Finland – on YLE's radio services the pips are broadcast on the hour.
 France – the station France Inter broadcasts four very short pips every hour, which are almost invariably crashed. The last pip, which is as long as the other ones, marks the top of the hour. Some local stations of the France Bleu network also air four pips that are a little longer than Inter's.
 Germany – Deutschlandfunk broadcasts three beeps every hour, the last one being longer than the others; between 05:00 and 18:00 on weekdays they are broadcast every half-hour and sometimes omitted at 21:00 when there is no news programme scheduled. The sister station, Deutschlandfunk Kultur omitted Pips altogether with their rebrand in 2017.
 Hong Kong – a six-pip time signal is used on RTHK's radio channels. The signals, which are provided by the Hong Kong Observatory, are broadcast every half-hour during the day and on the hour at night, immediately before the news headline reports.
 Hungary – the national radio channel Kossuth broadcasts five stereophonic pips at the top of every hour, the fifth being longer than the others.
 India – six pips are used by All India Radio before starting its Delhi news bulletins.
 Ireland – six pips are broadcast before news bulletins at 00:00, 07:00 and 13:00 on RTÉ Radio 1.
 Israel –  On Israeli Public Broadcasting Corporation hourly radio news, 5 tones (part of a recording of Kol Israel's original beeps) play counting down to the hour. Right as the hour starts, a jingle starts playing, the end of which includes the IPBC's sonic ident and an a cappella singing the name of the broadcaster "Kan". This jingle replaced the original 6 tones that played on Kol Israel's hourly newscasts - six tones, with the sixth tone being longer. As of 2017 (when public broadcaster IBA got shut down and replaced by the IPBC or "Kan"), the intro got changed and added a jingle.
 Italy – The National Italian Radio "Rai" uses 6 tones to signal exact time in all its stations. They differ in the timing: Rai Radio 1 tells the hour. Rai Radio 2 tells on the half hour (at 6:30, 7:30, 8:30, 10:30, 12:30, 13:30, 17:30, 19:30, 21:30 and 23:30). Rai Radio 3 signals the 45 minute of selected hours (at 6:45, 8:45, 13:45 and 18:45) All the signals come from the Istituto Metrologico di Torino, the national study centre for measure and time. Also on Rai Radio 2 and Rai Radio 3 tells at 6 o'clock on start the new day.
 Japan – NHK Television formerly used three short pips played at :57 to :59 of the clock ident and a longer three-second pip from :00 to :03 just before the start of news programmes. The longer three-second pip can however be crashed shortly after the :00 mark on certain special events or if there was time constraints.
 Latvia - Latvijas Radio stations LR-1, LR-2 and LR-4 used to play the pips (5 pips and 1 beep) at 9:00, 12:00 and 15:00. The pips are not played on LR-3 Klasika. In present, the pips are no longer played.
 Lithuania – All lithuanian public & commercial radio stations broadcasting every hour, but LRT Radijas and LRT Klasika non broadcasting at midnight (after the National Anthem) and midday (with a bells from Vilniaus' Cathedral before Midday News), and on special transmissions, before and after mass.
 Malaysia – RTM radio stations use the pips hourly before the news broadcast but only the top-of-the-hour pip is sounded. Until late 2012, the time signal is simply a short pip on the 59th second before the hour and a longer pip on the top of the hour. In a news report in The Star on 1 January 1982, the pips were used to sound similar to the BBC's.
 Netherlands – only three pips (two pips and one beep) were used from 1991 to 2018. Broadcast of the pips has stopped with the last transmission at 7:00 on 2 October 2018.
 New Zealand – the equivalent of BBC Radio 4, Radio New Zealand National, plays the six pips at the top of every hour.
 North Korea  the pips are heard on Voice of Korea before its startup at 17:00.
 Poland - The main radio broadcaster using the pips is Polish Radio. Polish Radio broadcasts 5 pips and 1 beep before the hour from the Laboratory of Time and Frequency of the Central Office of Measures in Warsaw. Polskie Radio Jedynka does not broadcast the pips on Sundays, 3 May (Polish Constitution Day), 15 August (Polish Armed Forces Day) and 11 November (Polish Independence Day) at 9:00 in the morning, due to the broadcasts of The Holy Mass and the Special Presentation. Polskie Radio 24 does not broadcast the pips on special reports and presentations. The pips are not being broadcast on Polskie Radio Czwórka, Polskie Radio dla Zagranicy and other digital radio stations. The pips in commercial radio are broadcast on RMF FM (5 little pips (since 2001 to 2003) and 4 little pips (since 2003 to now)) before newscast in each hour, but before 2001, the pips broadcasting only at midnight (5 little pips) on 31 December/1 January each New Year. In 1990-2002 they were used on(four pips) Radio ZET before newscast and welcoming the year. The pips were also used on Radio Plus in 1992 to 2004 before the newscast and while welcoming new year.  Since 12 September 2002 to 20 October 2014 the pips were broadcast on former commercial radio station Radio PiN at from 06:00 to 18:00 (2 little pips at :58 and :59 and 1 beep at :00) before the newscast.
 Romania - Romanian state radio channel Radio România Actualități broadcasts 6 little beeps before each news bulletin. On Radio Cluj, it broadcasts 5 short beeps and 1 beep before local news. Radio Iași uses 16 beeps before local news. Pips were also used on regional stations before Radiojurnal when relaying Radio România Actualități.
 Russia - Russia's state radio channels broadcast 6 tones (5 little pips and 1 short beep). The duration of the 6th pip depends on the current hour: it's 100 ms at midnight (00:00) Moscow time (UTC+3) and increases by 20 ms every hour, up to 560 ms at 23:00 UTC+3 (the first 5 pips always are 100 ms long). Russia's state television Channel One broadcasts 6 tones too (at the end of a short melody) before newscasts and Vremya (the primetime news program).
 Slovenia - on RTV Slo radio stations, 5 low-pitched short beeps and 1 high-pitched short beep is broadcast before the news and the information programmes at 5:30, 7:00, 13:00, 15:30, 18:30 (formerly at 19:00) and 22:00.
 Sindh The Sindhi language news channel KTN News plays 5 pips at the start of each news hour.
 Spain – the signal is broadcast by almost all radio stations, even by music stations, but depends on the frequency: music stations usually use pips on the hour, but most of the non-musical stations broadcast the signal every 30 minutes. Los 40 Principales, the most important music radio in Spain, broadcast a different version of GTS: two first pips sound and then a music is added on the background, using the rhythm to create the corporative jingle of the radio. This station in particular uses only 4 pips, typically the two last using two different frequencies (resulting in a modern rhythm). Other musical radios like Máxima FM and M80 Radio, both owned by PRISA, and Europa FM use a similar effect.
 Catalonia, Spain – dance music station Flaix FM and Hot AC station Ràdio Flaixbac, both owned by the same media group, broadcast every half-hour a very short sequence of two very short tones followed by a longer one, the whole lasting not more than one and a half seconds. Els 40 Principals, the Catalan edition of Spanish radio Los 40 Principales, use the same jingle, using a mix of GTS and corporative music.
 Sri Lanka – Sri Lanka Broadcasting Corporation uses GTS pips on their radio channels to mark the start of the hour at each main newscast just after playing the news theme music. Other stations do not use pips.
 United States – CBS News Radio broadcasts a single tone on the hour before the hourly news broadcasts. This is also the case for all-news radio stations such as WINS in New York. 
 former Yugoslavia – JRT broadcast the six pips before the news (on the hour) on radio as well as on television, before the start of the TV Dnevnik at 8:00 pm. The broadcast on TV was stopped in 1974 because the TV Dnevnik was moved to its current term at the bottom of the hour (7:30 pm).
 Vietnam – at the beginning of every hour, bells can be heard, then an announcer reads "It is now ... o'clock?", used on Voice of Ho Chi Minh City

See also
Time from NPL
National Research Council Time Signal – A CBC Radio One indicator for 1300 ET

References

External links 
The Greenwich Time Signal

BBC World Service programmes
Time signal radio stations
International broadcasting
Time in the United Kingdom
Telecommunications-related introductions in 1924